Kidz Sports is a series of 4 games developed by Data Design Interactive between 2004 and 2008. The games are Kidz Sports Basketball (2004), Kidz Sports Ice Hockey (2008), Kidz Sports International Soccer (2008), and Kidz Sports Crazy Mini Golf (2008). The games were generally critically panned.

Games

Basketball

Kidz Sports Basketball is a sports video game title from English developer/publisher Data Design Interactive. The game was released on the PlayStation 2 in 2004 and on the PC in 2006. It was released on the Wii in 2008.

Kidz Sports Basketball was reviewed by IGN, and received a 1.0 out of 10. It was criticized for awful gameplay, and bad graphics.

Ice Hockey

Kidz Sports Ice Hockey is a video game for the Wii console. It was created by Data Design Interactive, a budget developer.

The game received overwhelmingly negative reviews, including a 1.0/10 from IGN, saying that "There isn't a single redeeming quality in this package. Don't bother."

International Football

Kidz Sports International Football (known as Kidz Sports International Soccer in North America and City Soccer Challenge for the European-exclusive PS2 version) is a video game for the Wii console. It was created by Data Design Interactive, a budget developer.

Mini GolfKidz Sports Crazy Mini Golf (or Kidz Sports Crazy Golf in North America) is a golfing simulator developed and published by Data Design Interactive exclusively for the Wii console. Kidz Sports Crazy Mini Golf'' is the only game from Data Design Interactive to use the Wii MotionPlus.

References

Sports video games
Video game franchises
Wii games
PlayStation 2 games
Windows games
Video games developed in the United Kingdom
Data Design Interactive games